Macrorrhyncha is a genus of flies belonging to the family Keroplatidae.

The species of this genus are found in Europe and Northern America.

Species:
 Macrorrhyncha ancae Matile, 1976 
 Macrorrhyncha ardea Chandler, 1994

References

Keroplatidae